Air South was a low-cost airline from the United States, headquartered in Columbia, South Carolina. Between 1994 and 1997, it offered domestic flights mainly serving the southeast of the country. For a time, a partnership with Kiwi International Air Lines was maintained.

History
The company was founded in 1993, though the first aircraft, a used Boeing 737-200, arrived with Air South on 12 July 1994. Over the following months, additional aging 737-200s were added (all of them had been delivered to their original operators between 1968 and 1979), and by 1995, the fleet had grown to a total of seven airliners. The initial business model of Air South in the first year of operation showed a modest profit, however after  management changes and a refocusing on new airline routes, the airline failed and went bankrupt.

Destinations
Air South offered scheduled flights to the following destinations during its existence with its small fleet of Boeing 737-200 jetliners:

See also

 List of defunct airlines of the United States

References

Defunct airlines of the United States
Defunct companies based in South Carolina
Airlines established in 1993
Airlines disestablished in 1997
Airlines based in South Carolina
American companies established in 1993
American companies disestablished in 1997